Saint Petersburg State Institute of Culture is a university in Saint Petersburg, one of the biggest preparation and further training centres for specialists in the field of culture and arts, the leader of humanitarian and creative education in Russia.

Curriculum

Bachelor's programme
 Library and information activity
 Social and cultural activity
 Psychology
 Tourism
 Musical and instrumental art
 Conducting
 Folk art
 Folk singing
 Production of theatre performances and festivals
 Musicology and applied musical art
 Art of Entertaining music
 Museology and protection of cultural and natural inheritance objects
 Culturology
 Sociology
 Linguistics
 History of arts
 Restoration
 Design

Master's programme

 Library and cultural activity
 Social and cultural activity
 Psychology
 Tourism
 Musical and instrumental art
 Conducting
 Folk singing
 Production of theatre performances and festivals
 Art of singing
 Musicology and applied musical art
 Museology and protection of cultural and natural inheritance objects
 Culturology
 History of arts
 Applied information science
 Management
 State and municipal administration
 HR management
 Hotel business
 Design

Specialist's programme

 TV and cinema production
 Acting technique

Post-graduate course
 Library science, bibliography science and book science
 Information systems and processes
 History of philosophy
 Theory and principles of training and education (music) 
 Theory, principles and organization of social and cultural activity
 Theory and history of arts
 Sociology of culture
 Theory and history of culture
 Museum science, conservation and restoration of historical and cultural objects

References

External links 
 Official website

 
Universities in Saint Petersburg
Educational institutions established in 1918
Universities and institutes established in the Soviet Union
1918 establishments in Russia